Parliamentary by-elections were held in North Korea on 19 July 1959 in 56 electoral districts. The reason for the by-election was an unusually high number of vacancies – more than a quarter of seats – in the Supreme People's Assembly.

The vacancies were caused by purges in the aftermath of an attempted coup d'état known as the August Faction Incident in 1956. Although there had been scheduled parliamentary elections in the meantime, in 1957, the purges continued into 1959. By the time of the by-election, 51 deputies had been purged and an additional five had died. Of those purged, 28 were members of the Workers' Party of Korea (WPK), seven from the Korean Democratic Party, eight from the Chondoist Chongu Party, three independents, two from the People's Republic Party, two from the Laboring People's Party, and one from the Union of People's Masses.

The Central Committee of the WPK forbade any mention about the upcoming elections in the media, probably in order to hide the true scope of the purges. Voters were simply informed that seats in their constituencies were open due to "anti-people activities" by their former delegates.

55 candidates of the WPK stood for election in as many single-candidate constituencies. Pak Sin-dok, the chairman of the Chondoist Chongu Party, stood in the remaining constituency. The voting procedure had been amended slightly from the previous election which had been criticized as undemocratic abroad: In 1957 there had been a white ballot box for votes "for" and a black one for votes "against". In 1959, there was only one box. A blank ballot paper counted as a vote "for" and one with the candidate's name crossed as "against". There were cubicles at the polls, but immense social pressure prevented virtually anyone from using them.

Some 1,200,000 votes were cast. Only 14 of them (about 0.001%) had been votes against the candidates. It was the last time that any voters had voted against in North Korean elections; all subsequent elections have reported 100% approval rates.

Results

References

Elections in North Korea
North Korea
By-election
Supreme People's Assembly
By-elections